"No Moon at All" is a jazz standard written in 1947 by David Mann and Redd Evans. The vocal parts were initially performed by Doris Day.

Notable recordings

Doris Day (1947)
King Cole Trio (1947)
Page Cavanaugh Trio (1948)
The Ames Brothers with Les Brown & His Band - Columbia Graphophone DO-70027 (1953)
Julie London - Julie Is Her Name (1955)
Betty Carter & Ray Bryant - Meet Betty Carter and Ray Bryant (1955) 
Anita O'Day - This Is Anita (1956)
Count Basie & His Orchestra (1956)
Barbara Carroll (1956)
George Shearing Quintet with String Choir (1956)
J.J. Johnson and Kai Winding - "Jay and Kai + 6" (1956)
Jeri Southern (1957)
Lucy Reed (1957)
Lita Roza (1957)
Mary Ann McCall (1958)
Brazilian Jazz Quartet (1958)
Jerry Vale - The Same Old Moon (1959).
Patti Page - The West Side (1959)
Mel Tormé - Swingin' on the Moon (1960)

Fran Jeffries (1960)
Rita Reys & the Pim Jacobs Trio (1960)
Ella Fitzgerald - Rhythm Is My Business (1962)
Nana Mouskouri (1962)
Robert Goulet - The Wonderful World of Love (1963).
Warren Kime & the Brass Impact Orchestra (1968)
Karrin Allyson - Sweet Home Cookin' (1994)
Nada Kneževic (1964)
Liz Antony (with Jerry Conrad & His Orchestra) (1999)
Brad Mehldau Trio - Day Is Done (2005)
Barbara Lea (2007)
Belinda Underwood (2008)
Rebecca Martin - When I Was Long Ago  (2010)
Stacey Kent - Tenderly (2015).
Diana Krall - Turn Up the Quiet (2017)
Seth MacFarlane - Blue Skies (2022)
Source:

References

External links

No Moon at All
Songs with lyrics by Redd Evans
Songs with music by David Mann (songwriter)
Doris Day songs
Songs about the Moon